Dall Lake is a 24-mile-long (37 km) lake in the U.S. state of Alaska.

Local Knowledge of Dall Lake
The Yupik village of Chefornak is down stream from Dall lake. The natives go  to the lake to fish, hunt, pick berries, and search for fossilized bones. It is not well known for fishing, but it has been reported that a crustacean resembling a triops is found in the lake during the summer.

Bodies of water of Bethel Census Area, Alaska
Lakes of Alaska